The  (aka ) was an annual outdoor music event in Cologne, Germany held for the first time in 1993 and halted in 2006. In various locations of downtown Cologne stages were set up and live bands performed and also other events were presented. The Ringfest used to be held at the MediaPark, on the Cologne Ring and the Neumarkt square. In 1993 some  visitors attended the festival already, growing to around  people in 1997, causing the organizers to claim the event to be the world's largest music festival. In 2005, about  visitors attended the festival.

The Ringfest was held for the first time in 1993. Approximately 200 bands have performed each year. Famous German groups such as Selig, Element of Crime, Die Fantastischen Vier, Brings, Fettes Brot, Caught in the Act, Söhne Mannheims, Guano Apes, H-Blockx, Sabrina Setlur, Götz Alsmann, Jürgen Drews, Anne Haigis, Extrabreit, Reamonn, and Sportfreunde Stiller, 

Since 2006 the Ringfest has not been held any longer. The organizers have justified the lack of organization with the difficulties of the music market.

In the last three years of its life Ringfest held parallel to the music fair Popkomm, which has taken place in Berlin since 2004.

Since 2004, the  festival has been held in Cologne. The festival focuses on electronic pop music. At the premiere 2004  visitors attended the festival.

References

External links
 c/o pop festival homepage

Music festivals in Germany
1993 establishments in Germany
2006 disestablishments in Germany
Music festivals established in 1993
Recurring events disestablished in 2006
Annual events in Germany